Max Samper (born 29 June 1938) is a French former footballer. He competed in the men's tournament at the 1960 Summer Olympics.

References

External links
 

1938 births
Living people
French footballers
Olympic footballers of France
Footballers at the 1960 Summer Olympics
Sportspeople from Haute-Garonne
Association football midfielders
Footballers from Occitania (administrative region)